On August 28, 2022, a gunman opened fire at a Safeway grocery store in Bend, Oregon, killing two men, one of whom was an employee, and wounding two other people before committing suicide.

Shooting
After leaving his Fox Hollow apartment building at about 7:00 pm, the gunman, 20-year-old Ethan Blair Miller, fired into his own vehicle, a 1997 Ford F-250, in the parking lot of the apartment building. The gunman, armed with an AR-15 style rifle and a shotgun, then fired into the parking lot of a Costco as he walked to the Forum shopping center.

At about 7:04 pm, Miller reached the parking lot of the Forum shopping center, where he fired into a Big Lots store adjacent to Safeway. Upon reaching the west entrance of the Safeway, he shot Glenn Edward Bennett, an 84-year-old customer. Two other shoppers of the grocery store fled when the shooting started, but later returned to help Bennett, who had been lying on the ground. Bennett later died from his injuries in the hospital.

The gunman then moved farther into the store, firing into aisles as he progressed. He eventually reached the store's produce section, where he was stabbed by Donald Ray Surrett Jr., a 66-year-old employee who had hid behind a produce cart in the store after he heard gunshots. When the gunman looked in the opposite direction, Surrett stabbed him with a produce knife and attempted to disarm him. However, the shooter eventually overpowered Surrett and shot him to death. Two other people suffered non-life-threatening injuries from the shooting.

After receiving an emergency 911 call, officers entered the grocery store from the front and back. At 7:08 pm, Miller was found dead from a self-inflicted gunshot wound. The two firearms he used were found near his body.

In total, the gunman fired more than 100 shots. While law enforcement has not completed its search of shell casings, they have recovered more than 100 shell casings from the gunman's apartment complex, The Forum shopping center, and the interior of the Safeway. Three molotov cocktails and a sawed-off shotgun were also found in the shooter's car.

Perpetrator
Ethan Blair Miller (October 31, 2001 – August 28, 2022), a 20-year-old Bend resident, was identified as the gunman. Prior to the shooting, he lived at a nearby Fox Hollow apartment building. Miller was also a former employee of Safeway. The weapons Miller used in the attack were purchased legally.

Miller wrote a private digital journal starting on June 29 on Wattpad detailing his plan and motivations for committing a mass shooting. In his journal, Miller wrote that he wanted to murder people due to isolation and his loneliness. He also stated that he wanted to commit a school shooting at his former high school on September 8 and was influenced by the Columbine High School massacre. However, Miller instead chose to open fire on the Safeway because he couldn't wait long enough for the high school to reopen. Miller also posted photos and videos of himself with guns on Instagram and YouTube.

Reactions
Kate Brown, the governor of Oregon, thanked first responders for their quick response to the shooting. She further stated that her heart went out to the victims' families, and that everyone has the right to safety from gun violence. On September 2, Brown, along with police chief Mike Krantz, fire chief Todd Riley, city manager Eric King, and Bend City Council members met privately with officers and other first responders at the Bend Fire Station. Additionally, Brown encouraged Oregonians to vote for Measure 114, a gun control bill, on Oregon's fall ballot.

Senator Ron Wyden said that the Oregonians who were present at the shooting needed our thoughts and prayers, and that the United States can't ignore another mass shooting when there are people grieving over the lose of their friends and family.

The Associated Press noted that the shooting occurred on the same day as unrelated shootings in Phoenix, Detroit, and Houston.

See also
 Mass shootings in the United States
 Gun violence in the United States
 Workplace violence

References

2022 active shooter incidents in the United States
2022 in Oregon
2022 mass shootings in the United States
2022 murders in the United States
Attacks on buildings and structures in 2022
Attacks on buildings and structures in the United States
August 2022 crimes in the United States
Bend, Oregon
Columbine High School massacre copycat crimes
Deaths by firearm in Oregon
Mass shootings in Oregon
Mass shootings in the United States
Murder–suicides in Oregon
Suicides by firearm in Oregon